Anne Grey de Courcy ( Barrett; born 1927) is an English biographer and journalist, including as women's editor on the London Evening News, as a columnist for the London Evening Standard and as a feature writer for the Daily Mail.

Early life and education
Anne Grey Barrett was born in 1927, daughter of Major John Lionel Mackenzie Barrett (d. 1940), of The Tallat, Northleach, Gloucestershire, an officer in the 13th/18th Royal Hussars, and Evelyn Kathleen Frances (1898–1987), daughter of Thomas Stewart Porter, of Clogher Park, County Tyrone (he took his mother's family name, Porter, instead of his father's, Ellison-Macartney, as an heir of the Porter family of Belle Isle, County Longford) Her mother was a descendant of Sir Alan Bellingham, 3rd Baronet. A brother, Christopher, was born in 1930. She was educated at Wroxall Abbey, in Warwickshire.

Career
De Courcy worked for the London Evening News as women's editor in the 1970s. In 1980, de Courcy joined the London Evening Standard as a columnist. Between 1982 and 2003, she was a feature writer for the Daily Mail.

Since 1969, she has produced a number of books, including biographies and social histories.

Personal life
In 1951, she married Michael Charles Cameron Claremont Constantine de Courcy, a journalist and RAF officer, half-brother of John de Courcy, 35th Baron Kingsale. He was killed in a flying accident in 1953, aged 22. She then married in 1959 barrister Robert Armitage (1921–1998) of a landed gentry family of Milnsbridge House, Huddersfield; they had three children.

Bibliography
Kitchens (1969)
Plan your Home: Starting from Scratch (1970)
Making Room at the Top (1974)
A Guide to Modern Manners (1985)
1939: The Last Season (1989)
Circe: The Life of Edith, Marchioness of Londonderry (1992)
The Viceroy's Daughters: The Lives of the Curzon Sisters (2000) (Irene, Cynthia, Alexandra)
Diana Mosley (2003) (on Diana Mosley)
Debs at War 1939–1945 (2005)
Snowdon: The Biography (2008)
The Fishing Fleet: Husband-Hunting in the Raj (2012)
Margot at War: Love and Betrayal in Downing Street 1912–1916 (2014)
The Husband Hunters: Social Climbing in London and New York (2017)
Chanel's Riviera: Life, Love and the Struggle for Survival on the Côte d'Azur, 1930–1944 (2019)
Five Love Affairs and a Friendship – The Paris Life of Nancy Cunard, Icon of the Jazz Age (2022)

References

1927 births
Living people
English biographers
English women journalists
People from Chelsea, London
Women biographers
Daily Mail journalists